Héctor Julio Tomasi (born 5 July 1928 in Buenos Aires) was an Argentine bobsledder who competed from the late 1940s to the mid-1960s. Competing in three Winter Olympics, he earned his best finish of eighth in the four-man event at Oslo in 1952. He also finished twelfth in the four-man event as well as 15th in the two-man event at the 1948 Winter Olympics. At the 1964 Winter Olympics he finished 16th in the four-man event and 18th in the two-man event.

References

External links
 
 

1928 births
Living people
Argentine male bobsledders
Olympic bobsledders of Argentina
Bobsledders at the 1948 Winter Olympics
Bobsledders at the 1952 Winter Olympics
Bobsledders at the 1964 Winter Olympics